Cocama (Kokáma) is a language spoken by thousands of people in western South America. It is spoken along the banks of the Northeastern lower Ucayali, lower Marañón, and Huallaga rivers and in neighboring areas of Brazil and an isolated area in Colombia. There are three dialects. The robust dialect is known as Cocama, Kokama, Kukama-Kukamiria, Ucayali, Xibitaoan, Huallaga, Pampadeque, and Pandequebo. By 1999, Cocamilla (Kokamíya) was moribund, being only spoken by people over 40.

Out of a projected ethnic population of 15,000, the majority of Cocama speakers, 2,000, live in Perú.  Remaining speakers live in Amazonas state in Brazil, where 50 out of 411 ethnic Chayahuitas speak it and it is known as Kokama or Kokamilla.  Most speakers are trilingual and can also speak Portuguese and Spanish. Very few are monolingual.  There are 20 ethnic groups in Colombia's Lower Putumayo area with an unknown number of Cocama-Cocamilla speakers.  Most expected speakers would also be trilingual, but the language may be extinct in the region.

Cocama speakers have a 3% literacy rate, compared with 50% for Spanish. Grammar rules have been developed and the language is written using the Latin script. Parts of the Bible have been translated into the language.

Cocama is closely related to Omagua, a nearly extinct language spoken in Peru and Brazil.

Phonology

Consonants 

Plosive sounds may also be realized as voiced.

Vowels

Phonetic realisations

Revitalization efforts 
In 2013, residents of Nauta, Loreto Province, Peru created a children's rap video in the Kukama-Kukamiria dialect, in collaboration with Radio Ucamara. The local radio station has been involved in conserving the language for "a few years," and "started managing a school called Ikuar, with the goal of teaching the language through songs and traditional story telling."

References

Notes

Sources

Further reading 
 
 .
 .
 Vallejos, Rosa. A grammar of Kukama-Kukamiria. Leiden, The Netherlands: Brill, 08 Apr. 2016. . doi: https://doi.org/10.1163/9789004314528

External links 

OLAC resources in and about the Cocama-Cocamilla language
OLAC resources in and about the Omagua language
ELAR archive of The Kukama-Kukamiria Documentation Project

Languages of Peru
Tupi–Guarani languages
Languages of Colombia